Hvidovre Church, located just west of Hvidovre Torv in Hvidovre, is one of the oldest churches in the Greater Copenhagen area and the oldest building in Hvidovre Municipality.

History
The church was built in the Romanesque style. The oldest part of the church is the eastern part of the nave. The chancel was demolished in circa 1155 to make room for an expansion at both ends. Part of the church was torn down during the Swedish Wars (1658-1659) and used as building materials for military structures by Swedish troops. The church was rebuilt in 1660.

In 1675 the church was expanded with a side nave to create symmetry in the architecture. The side nave became known as the Valby Nave (Valbyskibet) since it was reserved for the farmers from Valby when they were no longer allowed to attend Church of Our Lady in Copenhagen and did not want to mix with people from Hvidovre.

The first porch, built with timber framing, was replaced by a new one in 1763.

The gable and the west wall of the tower are decorated with two sandstone crowns. They were originally located on Copenhagen's Western City Gate. It was demolished in 1857 and the crowns were placed on the church in 1886. It had a steeple with three clocks which was removed in circa 1790. It weather vane is now located on the church tower and features Frederick IV's monogram.

The priest's room (præsteværelset) was constructed on the west side of the Valby Nave in 1952.

Cemetery

The church is as other village churches surrounded by a small cemetery. The oldest surviving grave is from around 1750. A private chapel built in red brick stands at the northern cemetery wall. It was built for a Hvidovre farmer and his wife.

Burials
 Thøger Birkeland (1922-2011), author
 Bertel Budtz-Müller (1890-1946), poet
 Karen Margrethe Harup (1924-2009), swimmer
 Peter Herman Hoffmark (1907-1987), composer
 Victor Johansen (1888-1967), painter
 Hans Peder Pedersen-Dan, sculptor (1859-1939), sculptor
 Johanne Pedersen-Dan, sculptor (1860-1934), actress and sculptress

Cultural references
The church was used as a location in the Bodil Award-winning  1955 World War II drama film Der kom en dag.

References

External links

 Official website

Churches in the Diocese of Helsingør
12th-century churches in Denmark
Buildings and structures in Hvidovre Municipality